The A234 is a highway in Nigeria. It is one of the east-west roads linking the main south-north roads. (It is named from the two highways it links).

It runs from the A2 highway near Abuja, the national capital, to the A3 highway at Akwanga, Nasarawa State In North Central Nigeria.

Highways in Nigeria